Endre Fejes (15 September 1923 – 25 August 2015) was a Kossuth Prize and Attila József Prize-winning Hungarian author, and a founding member of the Digital Literary Academy, with his literary works often based on working life.

Literary career
In 1955 he began to publish his stories, in particular, the Budapest working life. The first novel, A hazudós, was published in 1958. His most notable novel, Rozsdatemető, was a best seller in its publication in 1962.

Bibliography
 A hazudós (short story, 1958)
 Rozsdatemető (novel, 1962, published in English as "Generation of Rust")
 Vidám cimborák (short story, 1966)
 Mocorgó (drama, 1966)
 Jó estét nyár, jó estét szerelem (novel, 1969)
 Kéktiszta szerelem (plays, 1971)
 Cserepes Margit házassága (drama, 1972)
 A hazudós (and other works) (1973)
 Szerelemről bolond éjszakán (novel, 1975)
 Gondolta a fene (essays, 1977)
 A fiú, akinek angyalarca volt (novel, 1982)
 Vonó Ignác (drama, comedy, 1978)
 Drámák (drama, 1989)
 Szegény Vivaldi (short stories, essays, confessions, 1992)
 Lemaradt angyalok (short story, 1993)
 Szabadlábon (short stories, novel details, 1995)

1923 births
2015 deaths
Writers from Budapest
20th-century Hungarian writers
20th-century Hungarian male writers
Attila József Prize recipients